Taras Lutsenko (born 1 February 1974 in Kyiv, Soviet Union) is a retired Ukrainian football goalkeeper for FC Dynamo Kyiv. He is now a goalkeeper coach of the Dynamo Kyiv reserves and youth team.

References

External links
Dynamo Kyiv Player Profile 

1974 births
Living people
Sportspeople from Kyiv
Ukrainian footballers
Ukrainian Premier League players
FC Dynamo Kyiv players
FC Dynamo-2 Kyiv players
FC Dynamo-3 Kyiv players
FC Nyva Vinnytsia players
FC Hoverla Uzhhorod players
Ukrainian expatriate footballers
Ukrainian expatriate sportspeople in Russia
Expatriate footballers in Russia
FC Elista players
Russian Premier League players
Association football goalkeepers
Ukrainian football managers